Mel Hains (born 3 March 1951) is a South African sports shooter. He competed in the men's skeet event at the 1996 Summer Olympics.

References

External links
 

1951 births
Living people
South African male sport shooters
Olympic shooters of South Africa
Shooters at the 1996 Summer Olympics
Sportspeople from Pretoria
20th-century South African people